Jan Åke Ullsten (born 29 November 1954) is a Swedish curler.

In 1980 he was inducted into the Swedish Curling Hall of Fame.

Teams

References

External links
 

Living people
1954 births
Swedish male curlers
Swedish curling champions
20th-century Swedish people